Mandaean names can include both birth names (i.e., secular names) and baptismal (zodiacal) names (i.e., religious names), called malwasha in Mandaic.

Birth names
Mandaean birth names are secular names that are given at birth and are used by non-Mandaeans to refer to Mandaeans in everyday life.

Malwasha (baptismal names)
In Mandaeism, a baptismal (zodiacal) or masbuta name, also known as malwasha (which can also mean 'zodiac'), is a religious name given by a Mandaean priest to a person, as opposed to a birth name. The baptismal name of a priest reflects his spiritual lineage, with his "spiritual father" being the priest who had initiated him rather than his biological father. Since they are spiritual names that are typically used only within the Mandaean community, Mandaeans may often be reluctant to reveal their baptismal names to non-Mandaeans. As a result, baptismal names are never used as legal names. The malwasha is used to protect a Mandaean from their zodiac sign. This is due to the twelve zodiac constellations being seen as part of the evil spirit Ruha's entourage.

A lay Mandaean's malwasha is linked with the mother's name. For example, Mhattam Yohanna bar Simat (written as  ) means "Mhattam Yohanna son of Simat," his mother. When naming a child, the priest takes the zodiac sign of the birth month and calculates the hour of birth sign from the zodiacal circle. The resulting numerical value has the mother's name value subtracted from it. The Book of the Zodiac is consulted to find a Mandaeans malwasha.

The colophons of Mandaean texts usually refers to scribes by their malwasha (baptismal) rather than birth names. For example, Ganzibra Jabbar Choheili is referred to in Mandaean texts by his baptismal name Mhatam Yuhana.

Although rare, a few non-Mandaeans have also been given Mandaean baptismal names in recognition of their contributions to Mandaean society. MS. DC 2, which was copied by Sheikh Negm in 1933, mentions the Mandaean baptismal name of E. S. Drower as Klila beth Šušian ("Wreath, daughter of Susan"), as her middle name Stefana means 'wreath' in Greek. MS. DC 26, a manuscript copied by Sheikh Faraj for Drower in 1936, contains two qmahas (exorcisms). MS. DC 26 is dedicated to Drower's daughter, Margaret ("Peggy"), who is given the Mandaean baptismal name Marganita beth Klila ("Pearl, daughter of Wreath") in the text.

Below are some auspicious malwašia and their associated numerical values as listed in Book 3 of the Sfar Malwašia.

Male names
Ram, Yuhana, Zihan and Mahan, Ram, Ziwa Daimur
Zakia, Zihrun, Bhira, Bihdad, Bainia, Zazai, Hurmizdukt
Yahia Maimun, Manduiia, Sukhiia, Saiwia, ʿQaiam
Bayan, Bulbul, Sku-Yawar, Bulfaraz, Ram-Šilai
Sam Paiiš, Ramuia, Šabur, Sabur, Šad-Manda
Bihram, Šitil, Sarwan, ʿQaiam, Tibit, Zandana, Brik-Yawar, Zakia-Yawar
Mhatam (Mhattam), Bihram, Sandan, Malia
Šaiar, Ziwa-Šadan, Natar
Anuš, Hibil, Ruzbia, Samuiia, Natar
Adam, Bakhtiar, Batia Zakria
Br-Hiia, Šitlan, Nṣab, Zangia
Gadana, Šitluia

Female names
Hawa, Dihgan, Škinta, Haiuna, Mdinat, Mamuia
Šarat, Samra, Pašta
Šadia, Yasmin, Ruhmaita, Hiia-Daia, Dukta, Handan
Mudalal, Rhima, Mihrizad
Anhar, Kaizariʿil
Mahnui, Banana, Dinartia, Kumraita
Simat, Murwaria, Buran, Dmut-Hiia
Simat-Hiia, Sindaita, Šahmia
Qinta, Anat-Hiia, Kisna, Rhimat-Hiia
Mamania, Marganita, ʿQaimat, Zadia, Suta
Murwarid, Manu-Qinta, Paiwa
Bibia, Maliha, Nargis, Biṣam

Matronymic names
Lay Mandaeans historically did not have actual family names or surnames, but were rather referred to by the names of their mothers in their malwasha using the prefix bar (written as  br in the Mandaic script) for a male and beth (written as  pt in the Mandaic script) for a female, such as Mhattam Yohanna bar Simat and Mahnash beth Simat respectively. Early priests or religious leaders such as Anush bar Danqa and Zazai d-Gawazta bar Hawa used matronymic names as well as the earliest Mandaean scribe Shlama beth Qidra. Ganzibra Jabbar Choheili's matronymic malwasha is Mhatam Yuhana bar Sharat.

Patronymic names
Modern priests are an exception and named after their fathers if they were also priests. An example name would be Mhatam Zihrun bar Adam ("Mhatam Zihrun, son of Adam"), which is the malwasha baptismal name of Ganzibra Dakhil Aidan (his birth name).  Ganzibra Jabbar Choheili's patronymic malwasha is Mhatam Yuhana bar Yahya. Birth or secular names (not malwasha) are also patronymic. An example is Lamia Abbas Amara; Lamia is her given name, while Abbas is her father's name, and Amara is her paternal grandfather's name.

Surnames
Today, Mandaeans are officially registered with surnames that are derived from the names of their clans, such as Choheili (the Persian pronunciation of Kuhailia, a Mandaean clan or extended family).

Historically, some Mandaeans have also been known as Al-Ṣābi’, such as Hilal al-Sabi'.

See also

Bihram
Christian name
Jewish name
Naming ceremony
Papal name
Religious name

References

Given names
Mandaeism
Baptism
Names by culture